Maithreem Bhajata मैत्रीं भजत   is a benediction composed in Sanskrit by Jagadguru Shri Chandrasekharendra Saraswati, renowned as the Paramacharya of Kanchi.

The song was set to a Ragamalika by composer Shri Vasant Desai.

Historical Importance
It was rendered at the United Nations on Oct. 23, 1966 on the occasion of the UN day, UN-day-1966 by Bharat Ratna Smt. M. S. Subbulakshmi and Dr. Radha Viswanathan and received a standing ovation.

The lines in the lyrics which says "dāmyata datta dayadhvaṃ janatāḥ" have mythological importance. Legend has it that the creator ( Prajapathi ) had 3 sons. Namely men, demons and gods. After Prajapathi taught them their lessons as a father, the three groups of students approached Prajapathi and asked for one final lesson. When the gods approached him and asked for their lesson, he said the word "da" and asked them whether they understood. They said, yes, you have asked us to control our self and the "da" means "damyatham" or self restraint. Identically, he said the same word "da" when the other two groups approached him as well. The men understood "da" as "datta" which means being charitable and the demons understood "da" as "dayadhwam" which meant being kind. At this point a thundering sound was heard from the heavens that said "da da da, damaytha datta dayadhwam" which suggested the three axioms everyone of us should learn.

Maithreem Bhajata is a song that tells us how we should all live our lives, in the short span we have, called life.

Information
Raaga - Sung in Ragamalika. Yaman Kalyani and Kapi.

Tala - Adi

Lyricshttp://www.acharya.gen.in:8080/maitreem.php 

 मैत्रीं भजत अखिलहृज्जेत्रीम् 
 आत्मवदेव परानपि पश्यत ।
 युद्धं त्यजत स्पर्धां त्यजत 
 त्यजत परेषु अक्रममाक्रमणम् ॥
 जननी पृथिवी कामदुघाऽऽस्ते 
 जनको देवः सकलदयालुः ।
 दाम्यत दत्त दयध्वं जनताः 
 श्रेयो भूयात् सकलजनानाम् ॥

 maitrīṃ bhajata akhilahṛjjetrīm 
 ātmavadeva parānapi paśyata |
 yuddhaṃ tyajata spardhāṃ tyajata 
 tyajata pareṣu akramam ākramaṇam ||
 jananī pṛthivī kāmadughā(ā)ste 
 janako devaḥ sakaladayāluḥ |
 dāmyata datta dayadhvaṃ janatāḥ 
 śreyo bhūyāt sakalajanānām ||

Translation
Cultivate friendship, which will conquer all hearts,

Look upon others as thyself.

Renounce war.

Forswear competition.

Give up aggression on others,

Earth our Mother is here, ready to give us all our desires

We have the Lord our Father, compassionate to all.

Ye people of this world!

Restraint yourself, be kind.

May all people be happy and prosperous 

Let good happen to all,

Let good happen to all,

Let good happen to all.

References

Sources
 http://rlalitha.wordpress.com/2009/06/27/maitreem-bhajata-a-benediction/
 https://outreach.un.org/specialevents/content/un-day-concert-1966
 http://stotraratna.sathyasaibababrotherhood.org/a228.htm
 Listen to Maitreem Bhajatha by MS on YouTube - https://www.youtube.com/watch?v=Wg6S1DoQA6A
 Listen to Maitreem Bhajatha by Vishaka Hari along with English exposition - https://www.youtube.com/watch?v=5ixzlwK-LSI
 Listen to Maitreem Bhajatha by IndianRaga Labs Los Angeles - https://www.youtube.com/watch?v=9NIhnpYH4NA

Hymns